Raven Leilani Baptiste (born August 26, 1990) is an American writer who publishes under the name Raven Leilani. Her debut novel Luster was released in 2020 to critical acclaim.

Early life and education 
Leilani grew up in a family of artists in the Bronx before they moved to a suburb of Albany, New York. She grew up as a Seventh-day Adventist, and later left the church. Having attended an art high school, Leilani expected to become a visual artist. She graduated Marist College located in Poughkeepsie, NY in 2012, where she studied English and psychology.

Her first job was as an imaging specialist at Ancestry.com, having previously worked in the archives of Marist College as an undergraduate. Later, she worked at a scientific journal, for the US Department of Defense, and as a delivery person for Postmates in Washington, D.C. She also worked as an archivist at Macmillan. In 2017, she began pursuing her MFA at New York University, where she studied under Zadie Smith and with writers Katie Kitamura, and Jonathan Safran Foer. She now lives in Brooklyn.

Career 
Leilani's debut novel Luster received significant attention at its publishing. The book's publisher, Farrar, Straus and Giroux named the book its novel of August 2020 as part of their "Dare to Imagine" campaign. It is also part of Marie Claire's book club and has been lauded by outlets including Elle, the HuffPost, BuzzFeed News, the New York Times. It has been praised by Carmen Maria Machado, Brit Bennett, Angela Flournoy, and Zadie Smith. Kirkus Reviews awarded Luster the 2020 Kirkus Prize for Fiction. Luster was also awarded the 2020 Center for Fiction First Novel Prize, the 2020 John Leonard Prize at the National Book Critics Circle Awards, the 2021 Dylan Thomas Prize, and the 2021 VCU Cabell First Novelist Award

Leilani's writing is influenced by her background as a visual artist, her life experiences, poetry, and a love of comic books and music. She has written for publications including Esquire, The Cut, and Vogue.

Works

Novels

Short stories 
 "Hard Water" (2016), Cosmonauts Avenue
 "Breathing Exercise" (2019), Yale Review
 "Airplane Mode" (2019). SmokeLong Quarterly

References

External links 
 

1990 births
21st-century American novelists
21st-century American women writers
Kirkus Prize winners
Living people
New York University alumni
Novelists from New York (state)
Writers from the Bronx
African-American novelists
21st-century African-American women writers
21st-century African-American writers